Titanic: Challenge of Discovery is a video game developed by Maris Multimedia's Moscow studio and published by Panasonic Interactive Media on Aug 24, 1998 for Windows.

The player is part of an underwater archaeological team in charge of three famous wrecks: the Roman galley Isis, the German battleship Bismarck, and the RMS Titanic.

Based on the experiences of Dr. Ballard, Ballard commented that "My main goal for this CD-ROM was to bring alive all the challenges, intense excitement and triumphs that I experienced during my many voyages of undersea exploration".

It was "developed over two years by 40 Russian scientists".

LearningWare Reviews felt it was a "spectacular" idea but very challenging. PC World thought that an intriguing premise was let down by poor execution. CBS quoted Ballard as saying that he praised the graphical realism. Chicago Tribune deemed it "sophisticated and thoroughly engaing". Praising the games, Washington Post noted how "Few people make coffee-table CD-ROMs like this anymore". PC Mag deemed it "marvelous". Popular Science gave note of the game's realism.

References

External links 
 Main page

1998 video games
Adventure games
Video games developed in Russia
Windows games
Windows-only games
Works about RMS Titanic